Mohamed Abdel Rahman may refer to:

 Mohamed Abdel Rahman (fencer) (1915–1996), Egyptian fencer
 Mohamed Abdelrahman (footballer, born 1993), Sudanese footballer
 Mohammed Abdulrahman (footballer, born February 1989), Emirati footballer
 Mohammed Abdulrahman (footballer, born September 1989), Nigerian footballer
 Mohammed Abdur Rahiman (1898–1945), Indian politician
 Muhammad Abdolrahman, Persian physician
 Muhammad-Ali Abdur-Rahkman (born 1994), American college basketball player
 Mohammed Omar Abdel-Rahman, Egyptian extrajudicial prisoner of the US
 Muhammad bin Abdul Rahman Al Saud (1882–1943), Saudi prince and soldier

See also
 Mohamed bin Abdulrahman M. Hassan Fakhro (1906–1982), Qatari businessman
 Abdulrahman Mohamed (born 1963), Emirati footballer
 Abdulrahman Mohamed Babu (1924–1996), Zanzibari politician
 Abdulrahman Mohammed Jamsheer (born 1944), Bahraini businessman and politician
 Abdul Rahman Muhammad Nasir Qasim al-Yaf'i, Yemeni subjected to extraordinary rendition by the US
 Abdirahman Abdi Mohamed, Somali politician
 ʽAbd ar-Rahman ibn Muhammad (died 1825), Emir of Harar, modern day Ethiopia